Ouch may refer to:

Geography
 Ouch, Lower Dir, a town in Khyber Pakhtunkhwa, Pakistan
 Ouch (union council), an administrative unit of Lower Dir District, Pakistan
 Ouches, a commune in the Loire department in central France

Film and TV
Ouch! (1967 film), a British silent comedy film starring Peter Butterworth
Ouch (2000 film) (Aïe), a French film directed by Sophie Fillières
Ouch! (2004 film), an Irish comedy short starring Slaine Kelly

Music
 Ouch! (Lake album), 1980
 Ouch! (Ohio Players album), 1981
 OUCH! (Matt Watson EP), 2020
 "Ouch" (song), a 2008 single by N-Dubz
 "Ouch!", a song by The Rutles from The Rutles
 "Ouch", a 2006 song by Be Your Own Pet
 "Ouch", a 2019 song by Bring Me the Horizon from Amo
 "Ouch", a 1988 song by Rainy Davis
 "Ouch!", a 1963 song by Ricky Allen

Other
 Ouch!, a 1971 poetry collection by Peter Ackroyd
 An interjection that denotes pain
 Ouch! (gum), a brand of bubble gum from Hubba Bubba
 Organization for Understanding Cluster Headaches (OUCH), a non-profit organization that assists cluster headache sufferers and their families

See also 
Ow (disambiguation)